Daijiro Chirino (born 24 January 2002) is a Dutch professional footballer who plays as a defender for PEC Zwolle of the Dutch Eerste Divisie.

Career
Chirino joined the PEC Zwolle Football Academy in 2014 having began his career with local club ZAC. In 2019 Chirino signed his first professional contract with the club. In June 2022 he signed a new contract two year with PEC Zwolle, with the option of a further season. He made his first team debut in August 2022 in a 5-0 Eerste Divisie win against SC Telstar and shortly afterwards officially signed a contract extension into 2025.

On 4 November, 2022 Chirino scored his first professional goal against TOP Oss in a 5-0 win in the Eerste Divisie. Chirino played his first KNVB Cup game in January 2023 against Eredivisie side Feyenoord. Later on that same week he started two consecutive matches for the first time in his career playing as a wing-back against Heracles Almelo.

Personal life
Chirino has been good friends with fellow professional footballer Jayden Oosterwolde since they played youth football together at ZAC.

References

External links
 

2002 births
Living people
Dutch footballers
PEC Zwolle players
Eerste Divisie players
Association football defenders